NS9, NS-9, NS 9, NS.9, or, variation, may refer to:

Places
 Woodlands MRT station (station code: NS9), Woodlands, Singapore
 Uneno Station (station code: NS09), Kawanishi, Hyōgo Prefecture, Japan
 Maruyama Station (Saitama), station code: NS09; Ina, Saitama, Japan
 Clayton Park West (electoral district), constituency N.S. 09; Nova Scotia, Canada

Aerospace
 Northrop NS-9, U.S. flying wing bomber
 RAF N.S. 9, a British NS class airship
 Blue Origin NS-9, a 2018 July 18 Blue Origin suborbital spaceflight mission for the New Shepard

Other uses
 Netscape Navigator 9, a webbrowser

See also

 NS (disambiguation)
 9 (disambiguation)